The IFFHS World's Best National Coach is an association football award given annually, since 1996, to the most outstanding national team coach as voted by the International Federation of Football History & Statistics (IFFHS). The votes, in 1996, were cast by IFFHS's editorial staff as well as experts from 89 countries spanning six different continents. Since then, the votes are now awarded by 81 experts and selected editorial offices from all the continents. In 2020, an award for women's national team coaches was introduced. The current men's recipient is Argentina coach Lionel Scaloni. The current women's recipient is the England manager Sarina Wiegman.

Men's winners
Below is a list of the previous men's winners and runners-up since the first award in 1996.

List of winners

Statistics

Continental winners 
 Bold indicates the World's Best Man National Coach winner.

All-time World's Best Man Coach ranking (since 1996)

The World's Best Man Coach of the Decade (2001–2010)

The World's Best Man National Coach of the Decade (2011–2020) 

In 2021, the IFFHS awarded an additional award to coaches by combining the points awarded in the annual World's Best National Coach awards, to the coach who had gained the most points collectively over the previous ten years to determine the best coach of the previous decade. This World's Best National Coach of the Decade award was awarded to Germany manager Joachim Löw who finished ahead of France manager Didier Deschamps.

Women's winners 

Below is a list of the previous women's winners and runners-up since the first award in 2020.

List of winners

Statistics

Continental winners 

 Bold indicates the World's Best Woman National Coach winner.

See also 
International Federation of Football History & Statistics
IFFHS World's Best Club
IFFHS World's Best Player
IFFHS World's Best Goalkeeper
IFFHS World's Best Top Goal Scorer
IFFHS World's Best International Goal Scorer
IFFHS World Team
IFFHS World's Best Club Coach

References 

International Federation of Football History & Statistics
Association football trophies and awards
IFFHS